is an actress. She won the Best Supporting Actress award at the 2001 Yokohama Film Festival and at the 25th Hochi Film Award for her performance in Nabbie's Love.

Personal life
She married a Japanese shoe designer in 2005, and gave birth to a girl on April 7, 2008.

Filmography

Film

 My Secret Cache (1997)
 Begging for Love (1998)
 Godzilla 2000 (1999)
 Waterboys (2001)
 The Happiness of the Katakuris (2001)
 Honey and Clover (2006)
 Forbidden Siren (2006)
 The Longest Night in Shanghai (2007)
 Little DJ (2007)
 Summer Days with Coo (2007)
 Mirai Yosozu (2007)
 ちーちゃんは悠久の向こう (Chiichan wa yuukyuu no mukou, 2008)
 Climber's High (2008)
 Nankyoku Ryorinin (南極料理人, "Antarctic Chef") (2009)
 Toshokan Sensō  (2013) as Maki Origuchi
 Library Wars: The Last Mission (2015)
 Reminiscence (2017)
 My Friend "A" (2018)
 River's Edge (2018), Haruna's mother
 Love At Least (2018), Maki
 Dad, Chibi is Gone (2019)
 We Are Little Zombies (2019), Minami Takemura
 The Journalist (2019)
 5 Million Dollar Life (2019)
 Sea of Revival (2019)
 In Those Days (2021), Baba
 Around the Table (2021), Haruko Aoba
 In the Wake (2021)
 Skeleton Flowers (2021)
 The Zen Diary (2022), Mika
 Sadako DX (2022), Chieko Ichijō
 Re/Member (2022)
 The Village (2023), Kimie Katayama

Television

 Furinkazan (NHK, 2007), Aya-Gozen
 Schöner, Ruhiger Garten (NHK, 2019)
 Pareto's Miscalculation (Wowow, 2020)
 Hanzawa Naoki season 2 (TBS, 2020), Sachiyo Tanigawa
 Come Come Everybody (NHK, 2021), Koshizu Tachibana
 Teen Regime (2022), Tae Sagawa

External links
 Official site
 Official blog

 JMDb profile

References

1972 births
Living people
Japanese actresses
Japanese female models
People from Fukuyama, Hiroshima